The Türkiye Top 20 (meaning Turkey Top 20) was a music singles chart in Turkey listing only non-Turkish, i.e., foreign-language songs sold in the country. The charts are now defunct.

Türkiye Top 20 was compiled by Billboard Türkiye magazine from November 2006 until decision to stop it. The charts were announced on the Billboard Türkiye website weekly, with the print edition of the magazine covering it monthly. In September 2009, the charts were only announced monthly, from the published magazine.

Most successful songs on the top of the Türkiye Top 20 chart were:
 11 weeks: Britney Spears – "3"
 10 weeks: Britney Spears – "Circus"
 10 weeks: David Guetta featuring Kelly Rowland – "When Love Takes Over"
 9 weeks: Rihanna – "Disturbia"
 8 weeks: Britney Spears – "Womanizer"

See also
 Türkçe Top 20 for Turkish language only songs published by Nielsen Music Control.

References 

Turkish record charts
Billboard charts